A weanling is an animal that has just been weaned. The term is usually used to refer to a type of young horse, a foal that has been weaned, usually between six months and a year. Once it is a year old, the horse is referred to as a yearling.

The word is also sometimes used to describe young cattle and pigs, but "weaner" is more common in the United States.

References
Lyons, John and Jennifer J. Denison. Bringing Up Baby.  Primedia Enthusiast Publications, 2002. .  Describes methods of training a young horse from birth until it is old enough to ride.

Types of horse

de:Absetzen (Tierzucht)